Matsuzaki (written: 松崎) is a Japanese surname. Notable people with the surname include:

, Japanese footballer
, Japanese table tennis player
, Japanese voice actress and singer
, Japanese singer and actor
, Japanese politician
, Japanese actor

Japanese-language surnames